Gümüşova is a town in Düzce Province in the Black Sea region of Turkey. It is the seat of Gümüşova District. Its population is 9,408 (2022). The mayor is Muharrem Tozan (MHP), elected in 2019.

References

Populated places in Düzce Province
Gümüşova District
Towns in Turkey